Mario Rinaldi (born 17 March 1966) is an Italian enduro rider and a four-time World Enduro Champion. He is also a four-time winner of the International Six Days Enduro (ISDE) World Trophy with Team Italy. Rinaldi won all his world championship titles with KTM; in 1992 and 1994 in the 350 cc class, and in 1997 and 2000 in the 400 cc class. He subsequently competed for Yamaha and Husaberg until retiring from the World Enduro Championship, and concentrating on the Italian national championship.

Career summary

ISDE

References

External links
Mario Rinaldi Enduro Academy

1966 births
Enduro riders
Italian motorcycle racers
Living people